The Philadelphia Association of Black Journalists (PABJ) is a non-profit organization founded in 1973 by Black journalists concerned about the lack of Black journalists in the media and the dearth of coverage of the Black community. It is the first and oldest association of Black journalists in the United States. PABJ is an alliance of all types of Black media entrepreneurs in the Philadelphia area, including public relations and other media-related professions. PABJ is the founding chapter of the National Association of Black Journalists (NABJ).

The organization's current president is Ernest Owens, and other executive board members include Benét Wilson (Vice President of Print), Charlene Horne (Vice President of Broadcast), Camari Ellis (Treasurer), Afea Tucker (Secretary), Tauhid Chappell (Parliamentarian), and Manuel McDonnell Smith (Immediate Past President).

History 
In Philadelphia in 1973, legendary Black reporter Acel Moore of The Philadelphia Inquirer met with The Philadelphia Daily News’ Chuck Stone and The Evening Bulletins Claude Lewis to rally local Black journalists and create an organization that would advocate for fair treatment, equity and accurate representation within their newsrooms. That organization, the Philadelphia Association of Black Journalists, would become the first association of Black journalists in the country, and the founding organization of the National Association of Black Journalists.

 Founders 
Donald Camp
 Acel Moore (1940–2016)
 Reggie Bryant (1941–2010)
 Claude Lewis (1934–2017)
 Chuck Stone (1924–2014)
 Mal Johnson (1922–2007)
 Francine Cheeks 
 Greg Morrison 
 Elmer Smith 
 Sam Pressley
 Sandra D. Long

 Committees and Task Forces 
The Philadelphia Association of Black Journalists boasts several committees and task forces that not only uphold the dogged tenets of community-first and community-oriented reporting, but give a nod to the ever-changing dynamics and evolution of the media industry.

 Public Relations Council, Current Chair: Afea Tucker
 Media Monitoring Committee, Current Chair: Aaron Eaton 
 Bylaws Committee, Current Chair, Tauhid Chappell
 Membership Committee, Current Co-Chairs: Manuel McDonnell Smith & Teresa Spencer 
 Scholarship Committee, Current Chair: Charlene Horne 
 Awards Committee, Current Chair: Haniyyah Sharpe-Brown 
 Advocacy Task Force, Current Chair: Benét Wilson
 Associate Member Committee, Current Chair: Sharron Cooks
 Entrepreneurship Task Force, Current Chair: Camari Ellis

 Presidents 

 Ernest Owens (2021–Present)
 Manuel McDonnell Smith (2018–2020)
 Melony Roy (2016–2018)
 Cherri Gregg (2014–2016)
 Johann Calhoun (2012–2014)
 Sarah Glover (2008–2012)**
 Monique Oliver (2006–2008)
 Keith Herbert (2004–2006)
 Denise Clay-Murray (2002–2004)
 Sherry Howard (2000-2002)
 Al Hunter Jr. (1998-2000)
 Roxanne Jones (1996-1998)
 Jenice Armstrong (1994-1996)
 Sheila Simmons (1992-1994)
 Vanessa Williams (1990-1992)**
 Heshimu Jaramogi (1988-1990)
 Michael Days (1986-1988)  
 Will Sutton (1984-1986)**
 Brahim Ahmaddiya (1982-1984)
 Joe Davidson (1980-1982)
 Mumia Abu-Jamal (1978-1980)
 Tyree Johnson (1976-1978)
 Acel Moore (1974-1976)
 Chuck Stone (1973)**

   ** Presidents that would go on to later become NABJ President.

 Awards Journalist of the Year2021: Bill Anderson, Cassie Owens, Raishad Hardnett2020: No award given due to pandemic2019: Cherri Gregg, Mensah Dean2018: No award given2017: Sofiya Ballin, Aundrea Cline-Thomas, Errin Haines2016: Carron Phillips2015: Berlinda Garnett2014: Solomon Jones2013: Monique Braxton, Cherri Gregg2012: Sarah Hoye, Jericka Duncan2011: Harry Hairston, Jesse Washington2010: Elizabeth Wellington2009: Arthur Fennell, Jenice Armstrong2008: Joyce Evans, Annette John-Hall2007: Melanie Burney2006: Denise James, Kia GregoryTrailblazer Award2021: Terri Andrews2020: No award given due to pandemic2019: Eric Nzeribe2018: Angela P. Dodson2017: Sara Lomax-Reese2016: Ernest Owens2015: No award given2014: Ed Bradley (posthumously)2013: Pamela Thompson2012: Phillip Dixon2011: Lorraine Branham2010: Harold Jackson2009: Jack Jones (posthumously)2008: Beverly Williams2007: Elmer Smith, Paul Bennett2006: Mal Johnson, Reggie BryantImpact Award2021: No award given2020: No award given due to pandemic2019: Yvette Ousley2018: Leslie Foster2017: Sandra Clark2016: Ceasar Aldama2015: Anzio Williams2014: Charlene Horne2013: Eric Hughes2012: Jennifer WigginsLifetime Achievement Award2021: Patty Jackson2020: No award given due to pandemic2019: Vernon Odom2018: Vincent Thompson III2017: Barbara and Tyree Johnson2016: I. Robin "Bobby" Booker2015: Barbara Grant2014: R. Sonny Driver2013: Bob Perkins2012: Fatimah Ali (posthumously)2011: Heshimu Jaramogi2010: Jack T. Franklin (posthumously)2009: Lisa Thomas-Laury2008: Vince Hill2007: Pete Kane2006: Malcolm Poindexter, Jr.Media Professional Award2021: No award given2020: No award given due to pandemic2019: Aliya Z. Khabir2018: Evon Burton2017: Haniyyah Sharpe-Brown2016: Aalyah DuncanCommunity Service Award''2021: Dr. Ala Stanford2020: No award given due to pandemic2019: Michael Burch2018: Lorene Cary, Glenn Ellis Sr.2017: Lois and Oshunbumi “Bumi” Fernandez2016: Cheryl Ann Wadington2015: Dr. Tammy Evans-Colquitt, Kenneth Scott2014: Earl Harvey2013: Elleanor Jean Hendley2012: Todd Bernstein2011: Kenney Gamble & Leon Huff2010: Thera Martin Connelly2009: Loraine Ballard Morrill2008: Michael Coard2007:''' Orien Reid

References

External links 
PABJ homepage

Organizations based in Philadelphia
Communications and media organizations based in the United States
African-American professional organizations
Organizations established in 1973